Mangoli or Mangole (Xulla Mangola - earlier name.) is a large island in the Sula Islands, which are part of North Maluku province in Indonesia. It has an area of 2,142.48 km2. At the 2010 Census, 36,323 people lived on the island of Mangoli, which rose to 39,736 at the 2020 Census. Its economy is dominated by the timber industry.

Districts 
The island is divided into six districts within the Sula Islands Regency, listed below with their areas and populations at the 2010 Census and the 2020 Census. The table also includes the locations of the district administrative centres, and the number of villages (rural desa and urban kelurahan) in each district.

Notes 

  Asia-Pacific Quake rocks Indonesian islands from BBC News, 30 November 1998

Landforms of North Maluku
Islands of the Maluku Islands